The 2018 La Tropicale Amissa Bongo was a road cycling stage race that took place in Gabon with an incursion into neighboring Cameroon between 15 and 21 January 2018. The race was rated as a 2.1 event as part of the 2018 UCI Africa Tour, and was the 13th edition of the Tropicale Amissa Bongo.

Teams 

The 16 teams invited to the race were:

Stages

Classification leadership

Final standings

General classification

Mountains classification

Points classification

Sprints classification

Young rider classification

Best African rider classification

Team classification

References

External links 

2018
2018 UCI Africa Tour
2018 in African sport
2018 in Gabonese sport
January 2018 sports events in Africa